Pattar Kalan is a village in Jalandhar district, Punjab, India situated on kapurthla to Kartarpur road. Its pincode is 144806.

Villages in Jalandhar district